Charls is a given name and a surname.  Notable people known by this name include the following:

Given name
Charls Walker (1923 – 2015), American political official

Surname
Rick Charls, American high diver

See also

Charas (disambiguation)
Chares (disambiguation)
Charis (name)
Charl (name)
Charla (name)
Charle (name)
Charles
Charli (name)
Charlo (name)
Charlos (disambiguation)
Charly (name)
LeCharls McDaniel